Iska Geri (1914–2002) was a German film and television actress.

Selected filmography
 Hello, Fraulein! (1949)
 Third from the Right (1950)
 The Veiled Lady (1951)
 That Can Happen to Anyone (1952)
 A Piece of Heaven (1957)
 Paprika (1959)

References

Bibliography
 Torsten Körner. Der kleine Mann als Star: Heinz Rühmann und seine Filme der 50er Jahre. Campus Verlag, 2001.

External links

1920 births
2002 deaths
German film actresses
German television actresses
Actors from Szczecin